The Rivers State Ministry of Employment Generation and Empowerment is a government ministry of Rivers State, Nigeria formed in July 2003, with a goal to "provide individual citizens with gainful employment and to empower them with skills to become self-reliant." The current Commissioner in charge of the ministry is Dr. Ipalibo Harry.

See also
List of government ministries of Rivers State

References

External links
Rivers State Ministry of Employment Generation and Empowerment

Employment Generation
Ministries established in 2003
Rivers
2003 establishments in Nigeria
2000s establishments in Rivers State